The Seventh-day Adventist Church in Australia is formally organised as the Australian Union Conference of Seventh-day Adventists (often abbreviated by Australians as "the Union"), a subentity of the South Pacific Division of Seventh-day Adventists. As of 30 June 2021, baptised church membership stands at 63,401. Despite its small size, the Australian church has made a significant impact on the worldwide Adventist church.

History 

The first Seventh-day Adventist church in Australia was the Melbourne Seventh-day Adventist Church, which formed on 10 January 1886, with 29 members. Ellen White, one of the church's founders, spent nine years ministering to the Australian Adventist community from 1891 to 1900.

Outreach to the Australian Aborigines has occurred since the 1890s.

For a representative sample of Adventist theology as taught by Australian lecturers and church leaders see the textbook Meaning for the New Millennium: The Christian Faith from a Seventh-day Adventist Perspective. It is not an "official" statement of belief (the 28 Fundamentals play this role), but rather "constitute[s] how a representative group of Australian teachers explain their beliefs".

Statistics 
The number of people who consider themselves Seventh-day Adventists is:
 1911. 6095
 1922. 13965
 1947. 17550
 1961. 31633
 1971. 41617
 1981. 47474
 1991. 48341
 1996. 52655
 2001. 53844
 2006. 55257
 2011. 63003
 2016. 62945

The 1996 National Church Life Survey revealed that of all churches in Australia, Seventh-day Adventists have the highest level of church attendance, highest proportion of members with post-graduate degrees, and the highest proportion who regularly contribute financially to their church.

Organisations 
The church's main tertiary educational institution is Avondale University College in the Lake Macquarie region in New South Wales. It offers numerous degrees including nursing, teaching and theology.

Despite being one of the smaller churches in Australia, the Seventh-day Adventist church in Australia operates a large number of schools  In 1992, the church had the 3rd largest number of faith-based schools (with the Catholic and Anglican churches having a larger number of schools each). However, the number of students at each Adventist school was low compared to other independent schools.

The Signs Publishing Company which serves the South Pacific Division, is based in Victoria and prints the Signs of the Times magazine. There are also two other magazine's printed by the Signs Publishing Company for the church. The first is the internal church magazine called The Record. The second is a youth focused magazine called The Edge. The church also operates the Sydney Adventist Hospital and the Sanitarium Health and Wellbeing Company based in Australia and New Zealand.

The Seventh-day Adventist church in Australia is a senior member of the Australian Christian Research Association.

Local Conferences 

The Australian Union Conference (website) comprises nine smaller subdivisions of "local Conferences".

Greater Sydney 
The Greater Sydney Conference (website) covers the city of Sydney and its surrounds, in the state of New South Wales.

North New South Wales 
The North New South Wales Conference (website) covers the region of New South Wales north of Sydney.

Northern Australia 
The Northern Australia Conference (website) covers the northern part of the state of Queensland as well as the adjacent Northern Territory.

South Australia 
The South Australia Conference  covers the state of South Australia.

South New South Wales 
The South New South Wales Conference (website) covers the region of New South Wales south and west of Sydney including the Australian Capital Territory.

South Queensland 
The South Queensland Conference (website) covers the southern part of the state of Queensland.

Tasmania 
The Tasmanian Conference (website) covers the island state of Tasmania.

Victoria 
The Victorian Conference (website) covers the state of Victoria. The Adventist church in Victoria is likely best known to the community for its annual production "Road to Bethlehem" (website), a dramatic reenactment of events leading up to the birth of Jesus.

Western Australia 
The Western Australia Conference (website) covers the state of Western Australia.

See also 
 South Pacific Division of Seventh-day Adventists
 Seventh-day Adventist Church
Seventh-day Adventist Church in Brazil
Seventh-day Adventist Church in Canada
Seventh-day Adventist Church in the People's Republic of China
Seventh-day Adventist Church in Colombia
Seventh-day Adventist Church in Cuba
Seventh-day Adventist Church in India
Italian Union of Seventh-day Adventist Churches
Seventh-day Adventist Church in Ghana
New Zealand Pacific Union Conference of Seventh-day Adventists
Seventh-day Adventist Church in Nigeria
Adventism in Norway
Romanian Union Conference of Seventh-day Adventists
Seventh-day Adventist Church in Sweden
Seventh-day Adventist Church in Thailand
Seventh-day Adventist Church in Tonga
Seventh-day Adventists in Turks and Caicos Islands

Further reading 
 Seventh-day Adventist Encyclopedia, "Australia", esp. 135-40
 S. Ross Goldstone. The Angel Said Australia (Warburton, Victoria, Australia: Signs, 1980)
 Alwyn Salom, ed. The Seventh-day Adventist Church in Australia. Kew, Victoria: Christian Research Association, 2002 (publisher's page)
 
 Arthur Patrick. Christianity and Culture in Colonial Australia: Selected Catholic, Anglican, Wesleyan and Adventist Perspectives, 1981-1900 (Sydney: Fast Books, 1993). PhD dissertation
 Milton Frederick Krause, The Seventh Day Adventist Church in Australia, 1885–1900. MA Thesis, University of Sydney, 1969

References

External links 

 
 Australian Beginnings on the official Adventist website
 Statistics from AdventistStatistics.org
 "A snapshot of the church in Australia" by Ken Vogel. Record 113:42 (1 November 2008), p8–9
 "Australian Union Conference" articles as catalogued in the Seventh-day Adventist Periodical Index (SDAPI). See also "Australia" articles

Christian denominations in Australia
History of the Seventh-day Adventist Church
Protestant denominations established in the 19th century
Adventism by country
Seventh-day Adventist Church in Oceania